Caesium peroxide or cesium peroxide is a compound of caesium and oxygen. It can be formed from caesium metal by adding a stoichiometric amount in ammonia solution, or oxidizing the solid metal directly.

2Cs + O2 → Cs2O2

It can also be formed by the thermal decomposition of caesium superoxide:

2CsO2 → Cs2O2 + O2

Upon heating until 650°C, the compound will decompose to caesium monoxide and atomic oxygen:

Caesium peroxide shows a Raman vibration at 743 cm−1, due to the presence of the peroxide ions. The compound is often used as a coating for photocathodes, due to its low work function.

References

Peroxides
Caesium compounds